Tunes of Wacken – Live is a live music album by German heavy metal band Grave Digger, recorded on 4 August 2001 at Wacken Open Air. It was also released on DVD.

Track listing
 "Intro"
 "Scotland United"
 "The Dark of the Sun"
 "The Reaper"
 "The Round Table (Forever)"
 "Excalibur"
 "Circle of Witches"
 "The Ballad of Mary (Queen of Scots)"
 "Lionheart"
 "Morgane Le Fay"
 "Knights of the Cross"
 "Rebellion (The Clans Are Marching)"
 "Heavy Metal Breakdown"

Personnel
 Chris Boltendahl - vocals
 Manni Schmidt - guitars
 Jens Becker - bass
 Stefan Arnold - drums
 HP Katzenburg - keyboards

Grave Digger (band) albums
2002 live albums
GUN Records live albums